Harry Leon "Suitcase" Simpson (November 30, 1924 – April 3, 1979) was an American outfielder and first baseman in Major League Baseball who played for the Cleveland Indians, Kansas City Athletics, New York Yankees, Chicago White Sox, and Pittsburgh Pirates in his eight-year career. He played in the World Series with the New York Yankees in 1957, which they lost.

Career
A native of Atlanta, Georgia, Simpson began his professional career with the Philadelphia Stars of the Negro National League, where he played from 1946 to 1948. Casey Stengel once called him the best defensive right fielder in the American League.

That his nickname of "Suitcase" came from his being frequently traded during his playing career is a common misconception. According to the 1951 Cleveland Indians Sketch Book, he was called "Suitcase" by sportswriters after the Toonerville Trolley character, Suitcase Simpson, because of his size 13 shoe with feet as large as suitcases. This is years before his many trades. His real nickname was "Goody", which came from his willingness to run errands and help neighbors in his hometown of Dalton, Georgia.

In 888 games over eight seasons, Simpson compiled a .266 batting average (752-for-2829) with 101 doubles, 41 triples, 73 home runs, 381 RBI, 271 base on balls, .331 on-base percentage and .408 slugging percentage. He finished his career with a .984 fielding percentage playing at all three outfield positions and first base. In the 1957 World Series, he batted .083 (1-for-12) with 1 RBI.

Simpson died in Akron, Ohio in 1979 at age 53. He is buried in West Hill Cemetery in Dalton, Georgia, where a section of the cemetery and the road leading to that section are named in his honor.

In popular culture
The character Luther "Suitcase" Simpson in the Jesse Stone novels and made for TV movies, by author Robert B. Parker, is given the nickname "Suitcase" by Jesse Stone who then explains to Luther who Harry "Suitcase" Simpson was.

See also
 List of Negro league baseball players who played in Major League Baseball
 List of Major League Baseball annual triples leaders

References

External links
, or Retrosheet, or Seamheads, or SABR Biography Project, or Pelota Binaria

1924 births
1979 deaths
African-American baseball players
American expatriate baseball players in Mexico
American League All-Stars
Baseball players from Georgia (U.S. state)
Chicago White Sox players
Cleveland Indians players
Diablos Rojos del México players
Indianapolis Indians players
Kansas City Athletics players
Major League Baseball first basemen
Major League Baseball center fielders
Major League Baseball right fielders
New York Yankees players
Philadelphia Stars players
Pittsburgh Pirates players
Sabios de Vargas players
San Diego Padres (minor league) players
Baseball players from Akron, Ohio
Wilkes-Barre Indians players
20th-century African-American sportspeople
American expatriate baseball players in Nicaragua